Raid is the brand name of a line of insecticide products produced by S. C. Johnson & Son, first launched in 1956.

The initial active ingredient was the first synthetic pyrethroid, allethrin. Raid derivatives aimed at particular invertebrate species can contain other active agents such as the more toxic cyfluthrin.
Currently Raid Ant & Roach Killer contains pyrethroids, imiprothrin, and cypermethrin; other products contain tetramethrin, prallethrin and permethrin as active ingredients. Raid Flying Insect Killer, a spray, uses piperonyl butoxide and D-phenothrin.

"Raid Kills Bugs Dead" slogan 
The product's original advertising tagline from its introduction in 1956 until 2017, "Raid Kills Bugs Dead", was created by the advertising agency Foote, Cone & Belding. The phrase itself is often attributed to the poet Lew Welch, who worked for the agency at the time.

The line was first used in commerce in 1966 and was trademarked in 1986. Noted animation director Tex Avery was the producer of the first "Kills Bugs Dead" commercials. Artist Don Pegler developed the bug characters used in the US and continued animating them for forty years. Pegler "codified the look, feel and animation" of the weird insects that run in fear of Raid, according to Steve Schildwachter, executive vice-president at Draftfcb.

The slogan had been part of a successful, long-running advertising campaign. Conjuring up images of an Eliot Ness-style raid on an illegal bar during Prohibition, the television spots have featured various cartoon bugs (Ones that appear such as, Mosquito, Fly, Roach, Ant, Spider and more etc.) plotting some silly scheme like invading a kitchen, or sometimes doing something like in a crime scene, or hanging out in some places, only to be attacked by the magical appearance of the product which swiftly dispatched the bugs to various giddily horrible deaths. The bugs would scream the brand's name ("RAAAIIIID!!"), and then a huge cartoon-style explosion would occur, presumably precipitating their demise. 

Similar campaigns have been run in other countries, either by dubbing the US cartoons or by producing local versions, including those for Baygon, another S.C. Johnson brand of insecticides.

Illicit use

In recent years, reports of the use of heavy duty bug sprays as an illicit drug have gained notoriety. Although products such as Raid are relatively safe to humans (when used as intended), the act of huffing, smoking, snorting, vaping, plugging, drinking and/or injecting Raid or other bug sprays can cause irreversible neurological damage, or even death.

In July 2019, it was announced that three people had died in West Virginia after overdosing on an unidentified wasp spray. Authorities have warned of a growing trend of ingesting bug spray in the southern United States, supposedly as a substitute for methamphetamine. Possible symptoms of ingesting bug poison include, but are not limited to: erratic behavior, nausea, headache, sore throat, extreme inflammation, redness of the hands and feet, auditory hallucinations, convulsions, coma, and death.

Competition
Raid's main competitors in the insecticide market are Black Flag, Hot Shot, Mortein and Baygon (also sister brand).

See also 
 Insect repellent
 Pesticide
 Wasp dope

References

External links
 

Insecticide brands
Reckitt brands
S. C. Johnson & Son brands
Products introduced in 1956
American brands